Zhang Xiaowen (in pinyin, for Wade–Giles: Chang Hsiao-wen) may refer to:
 Zhang Xiaowen (scientist) (张孝文), Chinese material scientist and educator
 Zhang Xiaowen (chess player) (章晓雯), Chinese chess Woman Grandmaster
Zhang Xiaowen (footballer) (張小文), Chinese soccer player

See also
 Xiaowen (disambiguation)
 Zhang (disambiguation)
 Xiaowen Zeng (曾晓文), Chinese author
 Chiang Hsiao-wen (蔣孝文), Soviet